Mount Temple Seamount, also known as Mount Temple  Knoll, is an undersea mountain in the North Atlantic Ocean, located about  southeast of Cape Race in Canadian waters off Atlantic Canada.

Mount Temple is one of the seven named Fogo Seamounts. Its name is derived from SS Mount Temple, a British steamship that traveled 4 hours in an attempt to participate in the rescue efforts following the Titanic disaster in 1912.

References

External links

Fogo Seamounts